= Memory of Justice =

Memory of Justice was a reggae band from the Cayman Islands. The band recorded several albums and was placed number one for eight weeks and two on the Caribbean Chart.
